Loughton Camp is an Iron Age (~500 BC) Hill fort in Epping Forest, one mile (1.6 km) northwest of the town of Loughton.

The camp's earthworks cover an area of approximately 10 acres (4 hectares) and are visible today as a low bank and ditch encircling the main camp. The banks were most probably once a single high rampart, used for defence and the appearance of the ditch suggests it was once very wide and deep in places.

The camp lies on one of the highest points in the surrounding area, on a ridge of high ground, likely to have once been strategic. It is speculated that the camp was used by the Trinovantes in defence against the Catuvellauni. Its elevation suggests that the camp was possibly once a lookout post. However, it may have simply been used as fortification for protection of cattle. A stone Iron Age grain millstone (quern) was found close by. More colourfully, local legend has it that Boudica used the camp, and that Ambresbury Banks was the site of her defeat in AD61 however there is no evidence to corroborate this.

The southwestern edge of the camp falls away sharply to an area known as Kate's Cellar (a hermit who reputedly once lived in this area of the forest).  An early 19th Century map shows Dick Turpin's hideout here (there are a number of locations within Epping Forest's  which claim the same).

The camp was 'discovered' by Mr Benjamin Harris Cowper in 1872. The first archaeology carried out was by General Pitt-Rivers in 1881. In 1882 the Essex Field Club further excavated the banks.

Roger Nolan, in his Julius Caesar's Invasion of Britain (2018) says there is no doubt that Loughton Camp was the third marching camp used by Caesar in his invasion of 54BC, en route from Kent to the defeat of the British tribes at Wheathampstead (Devil's Dyke). The Loughton site has never been comprehensively excavated; any proof of this might be apparent from such an excavation.

A corresponding camp Ambresbury Banks exists closer to the town of Epping. Both are Scheduled Ancient Earthworks and, as such, must only be explored on foot.

References

Kate's Cellar , historical fiction

External links

Images

Images of Epping Forest including Loughton Camp
Location of Loughton Camp within Epping Forest – map image
Detailed plan of Loughton Camp, Essex Field Club, 1882

Loughton
Iron Age sites in England
Hill forts in Essex